Frederik Ernst Koopman (22 October 1887 – 13 June 1980) was a Dutch rower. He competed in the men's eight event at the 1920 Summer Olympics.

References

External links
 

1887 births
1980 deaths
Dutch male rowers
Olympic rowers of the Netherlands
Rowers at the 1920 Summer Olympics
Sportspeople from Dordrecht